Yamraaj is a 1998 released Indian action film directed by Rajiv Babbar, starring Mithun Chakraborty and Jackie Shroff. The film was released on 31 July 1998 under the banner of Aabha Films.

Synopsis 
Yamraaj is the story of two thieves, Birju and Krishna, who dream of becoming the biggest dons like their mentor, the city's biggest don  Raghuraj Singh, also called "Yamraaj". Krishna's conscience starts troubling him as he assassinates an honest Police Officer Hamid Khan. He decides to start a new life, but Birju refuses to change as he is obsessed with his dream. Their difference in opinion leads to conflict between them, resulting in separation. Birju pursues his dream, while Krishna tries to repent for his crime. Whether Birju changes for good or becomes Yamraaj forms the Climax.

Cast 
 Mithun Chakraborty as Birju
 Jackie Shroff as Krishna
 Sneha as Nisha
 Mink as Asha
 Prem Chopra as Inspector Dharamveer
 Kiran Kumar as Inspector Hamid Khan
 Gulshan Grover as Raghuraj Singh / Yamraaj
 Ashish Vidyarthi as Raja
 Jack Gaud as Rampal
 Gavin Packard as Anthony D'Costa
 Gaurav Pareek

Trivia
The role of Birju was first to offer to Anil Kapoor and then Aditya Pancholi, but both of them leave the project due to creative differences then the makers decide to cast Mithun Chakraborty. Jackie Shroff was cast in the movie as one of the lead actors. Raveena Tandon was considered for the lead female role, but she declined the role

Soundtrack

External links

References

1998 films
1990s Hindi-language films
Mithun's Dream Factory films
Indian action films
1998 action films
Films shot in Ooty
Films scored by Anand–Milind
Hindi-language action films